DWNU (107.5 FM), broadcasting as Wish 107.5 (pronounced as Wish one-o-seven-five), is a radio station owned by Progressive Broadcasting Corporation and operated by Breakthrough and Milestones Productions International (BMPI), the media arm of the Members Church of God International (MCGI). The station's studio is located at La Verdad Christian College - Caloocan Building, 351 EDSA, Brgy. Bagong Barrio West, Caloocan, while its transmitter is located at the UNTV Transmitter, Sumulong Highway, Antipolo.

Online, Wish 107.5's first official YouTube channel is currently the Philippines' No. 1 YouTube channel by a local FM station with more than 4.4 billion views and 11.8 million subscribers and got its Diamond Play button from YouTube Creators Awards. The 2nd official YouTube account Wish 1075 (Wish USA) also got more than 384 million views and 2.37 millions subscribers.

History

1987–2010: NU 107

On August 31, 1987, an incognito radio station started broadcasting on the frequency of 107.5 on the FM band. Playing what was then known as new wave, the station aired for a month, no call letters, no jocks. When they finally announced "This is dwNU, if you're listening, please call." After the phone number was announced on the air, the phone rang continuously for three hours. Back then, its studios were located at Paseo De Roxas in Makati.

DWNU 107.5 FM was the brainchild of radio veteran Mike Pedero and banker/businessman Atom Henares. Born out of the need to come up with a product that would set the standard for good taste in music amongst the youths, NU 107 blasted the airwaves with rock, music that is "dynamic, young, passionate, creative, and always ready to renew itself."

2010–2014: Win Radio

The station debuted on November 8, 2010, as 107.5 Win Radio after NU 107 signed off for the last time on the same day. It is managed by Manny Luzon who became the EVP and COO on October 10, 2010.

Reformatted as a "more decent mainstream frequency", it distinguishes itself from its competitors through "responsible programming" without playing songs "with double meaning" as is the structure for the mass-based market. Just four months after its debut, it landed at #7 according to the March 2011 KBP Radio Research Council survey.

Last June 26, 2014, Win Radio had its last broadcast for the last time on 107.5 FM and transferred to 91.5 FM 2 days later, the frequency which was formerly branded as 91.5 Big Radio.

2014–present: Wish FM

In 2014, Breakthrough and Milestones Productions Incorporated (BMPI) led by its chairman and CEO "Kuya" Daniel Razon (also known as "Dr. Clark" on air), took over the management of 107.5 MHz frequency. The station transferred its studios from AIC Gold Tower in Pasig (its home since NU 107 era) to its current studio at UNTV Building in Quezon City. After getting access to 107.5 FM, BMPI finally occupied one of PBC's FM radio frequencies in Mega Manila that solidified its influence including other platforms of PBC on AM and TV, removing its connection to the defunct un-tee-vee era. At the same time, the station's transmitter facilities shifted from the old UNTV transmitter compound in Crestview Subd. to the new UNTV transmission tower on Sumulong Highway, Antipolo. Meanwhile, the Win Radio brand (under Luzon's management) transferred to 91.5 FM.

The station held its soft launching on June 26, 2014. While on test broadcast, it was temporarily branded as 107.5, playing automated music, stingers and a teaser to its newest radio jingle sung by Gerald Santos (composed by Mon del Rosario), aired on July 14, 2014, in preparation for the formal launch. Instead of initial branding P.S. FM, the station was officially launched as 107.5 Wish FM through the "Wish Concert" held on August 10, 2014, at the World Trade Center in Pasay. It officially signed on at 9:45 pm. Few months later, 107.5 Wish FM was rebranded as Wish 107.5 (pronounced as "one-oh-seven-five") on October 20, 2014. Willy "Hillbilly Willy" Inong became Wish FM's station manager from its inception until October 11, 2015, when he was replaced by Bryan "T-Bowne" Quitoriano took over his place.

During its official launch, 107.5 Wish FM also unveiled the first mobile FM radio booth in a bus, called the "Wish FM Bus", similar to the mobile radio booth introduced by its sister station, Radio La Verdad 1350 kHz.

The new 16-storey UNTV Broadcast Center, also referred to as The Millennial Tower and now called The Philippine Broadcast Hub along EDSA Philam is currently under construction to serve as its new headquarters along with UNTV (DWAO-TV) and Radio La Verdad 1350 kHz (DWUN).

In almost 7 years under the new format, in July 2021, Wish FM became the No. 3 most listened FM radio station in Metro Manila, based on the latest Nielsen survey.

Wishclusive Videos
Wish FM's program "The Roadshow" airs remotely from the Wish FM Bus, traveling along the metropolis. The program features local artists singing original compositions and covers of all-time hits. The "Wishclusive" performances, recorded in high quality audio and HD (1080p) video, are uploaded on YouTube. On its second year, Wish 107.5's official YouTube channel became the No. 1 YouTube channel from an FM radio station in the Philippines with more than 5 billion views and a subscriber base of more than 13.6 million as of November 2022, the first FM station in the country to reach over 1 million subscribers mark.

On March 28, 2016, Wish 107.5 launched their own television program, "Wish 107.5 TV".  It airs on weekdays from 4:30 pm until 5:30 pm (PST) on UNTV and hosted by DJ Jelly Kiss (Jelly Soriano-Angeles) of the program "The Roadshow", together with DJs Faye (Faith Marie dela Paz) of "Wishpers of Love", Alice (Precious Ong) and Princess Leigh (Leigh Domingo) of "The Wonderland". In July 2016, its timeslot on TV was replaced by UNTV News and Rescue's newest public service program, "Serbisyong Kasangbahay" hosted by Kuya Daniel Razon (the show would be eventually evolved as "Serbisyong Bayanihan" since 2020, when the country started implementing lockdowns due to the COVID-19 pandemic). In August 2016, DJs Jelly Kiss of The Roadshow and Princess Leigh bids farewell as DJs on Wish 107.5, for certain reasons. Singer Aliya Parcs was hired as DJ for the program "Wishlist", while The Roadshow is temporarily hosted by celebrity guest DJs, and later handled by Robin Nievera.

Wish 107.5 Music Awards

Since 2016, Wish 107.5 hosted its annual Music Awards, where they honored artists who were guested and performed inside the Wish FM Bus—also known as "FM Radio on Wheels", roving around the streets of Metro Manila and nearby provinces in Luzon, which would later be expanded across the Philippines; and even in Los Angeles, through Wish USA.

References

External links

 

Members Church of God International
Progressive Broadcasting Corporation
Adult contemporary radio stations in the Philippines
Radio stations in Metro Manila
Radio stations established in 1987
1987 establishments in the Philippines